Quincy Doudna was an American academic administrator who was the president of Eastern Illinois University from 1956 to 1971. He was previously an administrator at the University of Wisconsin–Stevens Point.

References

1987 deaths
Heads of universities and colleges in the United States
Presidents of Eastern Illinois University
Year of birth missing